Vaccaro is a surname. Notable people with the surname include:

 Adolfo Vaccaro (born 1927), Paraguayan football player and coach
 Alessandra Melucco Vaccaro (1940–2000), Italian historian and archaeologist
 Andrea Vaccaro (1600–1670), Neapolitan painter of the Baroque period
 Angelo Vaccaro (born 1981), Italian football player
 Brenda Vaccaro (born 1939), American actress
 Cris Vaccaro (born 1958), American professional soccer player
 Domenico Antonio Vaccaro (1678–1745), Neapolitan painter, sculptor and architect
 Francesco Vaccaro (footballer) (born 1999), Italian footballer
 Francesco Vaccaro (painter) (c. 1636–1675), Bolognese painter and engraver of the Baroque period
 Joan Vaccaro, physicist
 Kenny Vaccaro (born 1991), American former National Football League player
 Laura Vaccaro Seeger, American children's books author and artist
 Leopold Saverio Vaccaro, American surgeon who raised money for the reconstruction of post-World War I Italy
 Lorenzo Vaccaro (1655–1706), Neapolitan late-Baroque sculptor
 Luciana Vaccaro (born 1969), Italian-Swiss physicist
 Luigi Vaccaro (born 1991), Belgian football player
 Mike Vaccaro, sports columnist for The New York Post
 Nicolò Maria Vaccaro (1659–1720), Italian Baroque painter
 Rodney Vaccaro (born 1952) American screenwriter and film producer
 Sonny Vaccaro (born 1939), American sports marketing executive
 Tony Vaccaro (1922–2022), American photographer
 Tracy Vaccaro (born 1962), Playboy Playmate of the Month for October 1983
 Vaccaro brothers, Italian-American banana businessmen Joseph, Felix and Luca Vaccaro